Lawrence Hotham Weatherill (1905-1984) was a male athlete who competed for England.

Athletics career
He competed for England in the marathon at the 1934 British Empire Games in London. Four years later he competed for England at the 1938 British Empire Games in the 3 miles and 6 miles.

References

1905 births
1984 deaths
English male long-distance runners
Athletes (track and field) at the 1934 British Empire Games
Athletes (track and field) at the 1938 British Empire Games
Commonwealth Games competitors for England
Sportspeople from Norwich